Cha Ye-ryun (born Park Hyun-ho on July 16, 1985) is a South Korean actress. A graduate of Sangmyung High School, she began acting in 2005 at the age of 20, when she had a supporting role in the horror film Voice. In 2007, she made her official television debut as one of the main cast members in the melodrama Bad Love. Cha played her first leading role in the 2014 romantic-comedy film The Actress Is Too Much.

Personal life
Cha and actor Joo Sang-wook began dating in March 2016, after meeting on the set of 2015 TV series Glamorous Temptation. The couple later married on May 25, 2017, at the Grand Walkerhill Hotel in Seoul. Their first child was born on July 31, 2018.

Filmography

Films

Television series

Web series

Television shows

Music videos

Discography

Awards and nominations

References

External links

South Korean film actresses
South Korean television actresses
1985 births
Living people
21st-century South Korean actresses